Baila Conmigo may refer to:

 Baila conmigo (TV series), a 1992 Mexican telenovela and soundtrack album
 Baila Conmigo, an album by Rita Lee, 1982
 "Baila Conmigo" (Jennifer Lopez song), 2019
 "Baila Conmigo" (Selena Gomez and Rauw Alejandro song), 2021
 "Baila Conmigo", a song by Adelén, 2013
 "Baila Conmigo", a song by Akon from El Negreeto, 2019
 "Baila Conmigo", a song by Ranking Stone from Censurado, 2003
 "Baila Conmigo", a song by Yellow Claw, 2019

See also
 Baila Comigo, a 1981 Brazilian telenovela
 Dance with Me (disambiguation)